Paul D. Rogers is a major general in the Michigan Army National Guard. He is currently serving as the 34th adjutant general of the Michigan National Guard. He has been in this role since January of 2019.

Career
Rogers commissioned into the Army in 1987 through ROTC as a graduate of Michigan Technological University. As a lieutenant, Rogers was branched as an engineer officer. He started as a platoon leader in the 107th Engineer Battalion in Calumet, Michigan. Rogers stayed in the 107th Engineer Battalion until 1998 in various roles. In 2003, Rogers joined the 507th Engineer Battalion as the executive officer. In 2005, he became commander of the battalion and was in charge when they deployed to Balad, Iraq. In 2007, Rogers transferred to the Joint Force Headquarters in Lansing, Michigan. From 2009 to 2012, Rogers was the Regimental Commander of the 177th Regimental Training Institute. By late 2012, Rogers transferred to the 46th Military Police Command. He worked as assistant chief of staff, chief of staff, and finally deputy commander.

On January 1, 2019, Rogers was sworn in as State Adjutant General by Michigan Governor Gretchen Whitmer. Rogers replaced Maj. Gen. Gregory J. Vadnais who had served as state adjutant for over eight years. The State Adjutant General commands the Michigan Army and Air National Guard and acts as the Director of the Michigan Department of Military and Veterans Affairs which includes the Michigan Veterans Affairs Agency.

Rogers has been in charge of the Michigan National Guard throughout the COVID-19 pandemic. He has overseen the national guard response and relief in the state. The Michigan National Guard has been utilized at an unprecedented rate throughout the pandemic. Under the command of Rogers, there have been numerous state activations and thousands of COVID tests and vaccinations have been administered.

About 1,000 Michigan National Guard members were activated to provide security before and following the Inauguration of Joe Biden.

Education
 Bachelor of Science, Mechanical Engineering, Michigan Technological University
 Master of Science, Mechanical Engineering, University of Michigan–Dearborn
 Doctor of Philosophy, Mechanical Engineering, Michigan Technological University
 Master of Strategic Studies, Strategic Studies, United States Army War College

Personal life
Rogers most recently was employed as the United States Army Material Command as the director of the United States Army Tank Automotive Research, Development, and Engineering Command (TARDEC), a Tier 2 Senior Executive Service position. Rogers and his wife Sally have three children. He is a native of Calumet, Michigan and resides in Farmington Hills.

Awards and badges

Dates of rank
Rogers commissioned into the Army in 1987. His current rank is Major General in the Michigan National Guard.

References

Year of birth missing (living people)
Living people
People from Calumet, Michigan
Michigan Technological University alumni
University of Michigan–Dearborn alumni
American mechanical engineers
Michigan National Guard personnel
Recipients of the Meritorious Service Medal (United States)
Recipients of the Legion of Merit
United States Army generals
People from Farmington Hills, Michigan